Nerdcore Hiphop is a demo album by MC Frontalot, which first gave a name to the nerdcore genre, as well as the name of a song on that album. Because it was only released via the internet, the track listing is unordered, and includes tracks released from 1999 until his first commercial album, Nerdcore Rising, in 2005. The songs are therefore listed here in the order of which they were released. All listed songs are freely available for download through his website along with several remixes, mostly by Song Fight! regulars.

Track listing

References

External links 
 Official MC Frontalot lyrics

2004 albums
MC Frontalot albums